Knight Building may refer to:

W. A. Knight Building, Jacksonville, Florida
Joe Knight Building, Lebanon, Missouri, listed on the National Register of Historic Places
F. M. Knight Building, Portland, Oregon
Jesse Knight Building, Brigham Young University, Provo, Utah
Knight Block, Center Street and University Avenue, Provo, Utah

See also
Knight House (disambiguation)